Downtown Florence Historic District may refer to:

Downtown Florence Historic District (Florence, Alabama), listed on the National Register of Historic Places (NRHP)
Downtown Florence Historic District (Florence, Colorado), NRHP-listed

See also
Florence Townsite Historic District, Florence, Arizona, NRHP-listed in Pinal County